Erica multiflora is a species of flowering plant in the family Ericaceae. It is native to the Mediterranean Basin.

References

External links

 

multiflora
Afromontane flora
Matorral shrubland
Flora of France
Flora of Italy
Flora of Portugal
Flora of Spain
Garden plants of Europe
Plants described in 1753
Taxa named by Carl Linnaeus